List of rivers in County Clare is an overview of the named rivers and stream flowing (wholly or partly) through County Clare, Ireland.

95% of County Clare is located within the Shannon River Basin with the remainder in the so-called "Western River Basin District".

Main watercourses
 Shannon
 River Fergus, Shannon tributary, rises north-west of Corofin
 Fergus Minor River, branch flowing at the northern side of Ennis.

Navigable rivers within the Shannon-Fergus system
Commercial traffic has largely ceased, but there is sometimes leisure traffic.

 Moyasta River, Moyasta Bog to Poulnasherry Bay
 Ratty River, also named Owengarney River or O'Garney River, Shannon tributary, connecting Sixmilebridge. River trade was largely destroyed by the building of the "D’Esterre’s Bridge" with tollhouses in 1784, which was too low for bigger ships and the narrow channel made navigation for smaller ship too dangerous.
  Rhine, also named Latoon Creek or Ardsollus River, a tributary of the Fergus, connecting Quin
 Scariff River, a Shannon tributary, from Lough O'Grady to Lough Derg.

Other rivers part of the Shannon-Fergus system
 Anamullaghaun River, Graney tributary
 Ardcloony River, Shannon tributary.
 Ath Leathan River, Shannon tributary, near Kilbane.
 Ayle River, Graney tributary
 Ballybeg Stream
 Ballyfinneen Stream
 Ballygriffey River, Fergus tributary
 Ballynacally River, Shannon tributary, flows into Ballynacally Creek. Near Ballynacally.
 River Blackwater, Shannon tributary
 Broadford River, Glenomra tributary
 Caher River, Scariff tributary
 Clareabbey Stream, next to Clare Abbey. Fergus tributary.
 Claureen River, also named Inch River, Fergus tributary, Inch to Ennis
 Cloghaun River, Graney tributary
 Crompaun River, Shannon tributary. East of Kilmurry McMahon.
 Cromptaun River, Meelick. Shannon Tributary.
 Cloon River, Shannon tributary. South of Lisscasey, through Cranny.
 Cloverhill Stream
 Derrymore River, Shannon Tributary, near Kilkishen.
 Doonaha River, Doonaha Bog to Shannon, south of Doonaha
 St. Flannan's Stream, Ennis, Fergus tributary
 Gaurus River
 Glenbonniv River, Graney tributary
 Glenlon  Stream, Shannon Tributary.
 Glenomra River, Shannon tributary, near Kilbane
 River Graney, Scariff headwater, Lough Graney to Lough O'Grady.
 Bleach River, headwater of River Graney, Lough Atorick to Lough Graney
 Drumandoora River, headwater of River Graney
 Gurna River
 Hell River, near Clooney.
 Knockalisheen Stream, also named Ballycannan Stream, Shannon tributary.
 Mill Stream, Newmarket-upon-Fergus.
 Mill River, near  O'Callaghan's Mills, Kilgory Lough to Doon Lough.
 Moyarta River, Shannon tributary, Loop Head Peninsula to Carrigaholt
 Moyree River, Fergus tributary, from County Galway through Dromore Lake
 Owenslieve River, Shannon tributary, near Ballynacally.
 Owenwillin River, Graney tributary, near Feakle
 Scariff Stream, Scariff
 Shallee River, west of Ennis, near Toonagh. Fergus tributary.
 Tonavoher River, Shannon tributary. Flows into Clonderlaw Bay at Knock
 Wood River, Shannon tributary, near Kilrush

Rivers outside the Shannon-Fergus system

All rivers ultimately flow into the Atlantic Ocean.

 Aille River, sometimes named as Cronagort Stream, Lisdoonvarna to Doolin, south of the Burren
 Annagh River, Slievecallan to Spanish Point, partly border of the catholic parishes Kilmurry Ibrickane and Kilfarboy
 Kildimo River, tributary, rising on Slievecallan
 Annageeragh River, Lake Doolough through Lough Donnell, Clohaninchy
 Caher River, the only permanent overground river in the Burren (and even then with some parallel underground flow), flowing to the beach at Fanore
 Clonbony River, south of Moy to Cleadagh Bay
 Carrowkeel River, tributary
 Clooneyogan North Stream, Lahinch
 Cooleen River, Dealagh River tributary. Near Kilshanny.
 Cree River, also spelled Creegh River or Creagh River, north of Kilmihil, through Cree to Doughmore Bay
 Dealagh River, The Burren (north of Kilfenora) to Liscannor Bay
 Doonbeg River, also named Cooraclare River, near Kilmaley, through Cooraclare to Doonbeg and Doonbeg Bay
 Dough River, Dough (townland) to Spanish Point Beach
 Gawlaun River, tributary of the Aille River, Lisdoonvarna
 Inagh River, also named Cullenagh River, southeast of Slievecallan, though Inagh and Ennistymon to Liscannor Bay
 Moy River, Moy to Liscannor Bay
 Victoria Stream. Kilkee.

References
 Description of County Clare
 Google Maps